Sar Borj may refer to:
 Sar Borj, Bardaskan
 Sar Borj, Torqabeh and Shandiz